Telarus is a U.S.-based sales agency that holds contracts with commercial network, cloud, and cybersecurity providers, and consolidates the sales volume of a network of independent sales agents known as 'Technology Advisors'. As a Technology Solutions Brokerage, Telarus functions as the top layer in the two-tier distribution model that is recognized as a key success factor in sales of business voice and data services. The company also develops patented software to facilitate its price searches for voice and data telecommunications services. It has operations in Australia, Canada, UK, and the United States.

History
Telarus was founded in June 2002 in Huntington Beach, California by Adam Edwards and Patrick Oborn. The focus of the company was to offer improved service to commercial telecommunications clients.

Operating originally as a telecommunications reseller, Telarus generated leads using web and search engine marketing. They followed up on each lead, contacted the T1 carrier for pricing, and compiled each quote by hand.

Frustrated by this slow and cumbersome process of gathering information for prospective customers, Edwards and Oborn realized that to achieve scale, automation of price quoting was required. Oborn, who studied electrical and computer engineering at Brigham Young University, and had experience as the web master of Cognigen, recognized the potential of an automated sales process, and he set out with Edwards to do the same for commercial telecom pricing research.

In 2003, Oborn designed the initial concept for what was to be called GeoQuote - software that allows a user to access multiple carrier price options with a single search. Oborn partnered with Aaron Lieberman to write the code that could compute pricing based upon loop distance (the distance from the customer's central office to the carrier point of presence) or through direct access to a carrier pricing Application Programming Interface (API).

The prototype of GeoQuote was completed in August 2003. The software was embedded in Telarus' public-facing, real-time price research tool called ShopforT1.com.

In November 2003, Telarus, Inc. filed for a United States provisional patent to protect the idea and coding architecture behind the GeoQuote concept. On September 30, 2004 Telarus filed the non-provisional patent application, which was accepted by the United States Patent and Trademark Office on February 24, 2009. GeoQuote is now protected by US Patent Number(s) 7,496,184 and 7,916,844

In 2008, the company announced that it was adding the world's first fiber route mapping capabilities to GeoQuote.

In May 2022, Telarus launched SolutionVue, a software that offers detailed consulting advise through a series of discovery questions. SolutionVue is the first consulting tool that its Technology Advisors can customize with their own look and feel.

Acquisition History
VXSuite - In 2015, Telarus acquired the VXSuite assets of LVM, Inc., and begun offering free monitoring on all carrier circuits sold through their supplier agreements. Telarus also incorporated several members of the VXSuite management team into its own.

CarrierSales - In 2017, Telarus acquired rival master agent, CarrierSales, in an all-stock transaction. The deal increased both the staff and revenue of Telarus by 50%, making it the largest privately held Technology Solutions Brokerage in the United States. Richard Murray, president of CarrierSales, was appointed COO of the combined Telarus.

Technology Consulting Group (TCG) - On June 21, 2022, Telarus announced the acquisition of Telecom Consulting Group (TCG), a rival TSB headquartered in Ft Lauderdale, Florida. The deal brought 85 new employees to Telarus, raising the total number of staff to 400, making Telarus the largest TSB both by employee size and new sales revenue. Dan Pirigyi, former president of TCG, was appointed as SVP of Strategic Partnerships of Telarus upon completion of the transaction.

Value Added Services
Customer Success Management - In 2014, in an effort to help offload non-sales oriented workloads, Telarus launched its Customer Base Management program. Under the partner's brand, Telarus staff communicate directly with customers to help them resolve billing issues, make changes to their account, and to place orders for new services.

Sales Engineering - In 2018, at the request of many of its non-technical outside sales force, Telarus began hiring technicians known as 'Sales Engineers' to provide technical guidance, design, and vendor selection advice. Josh Lupresto was named SVP of Sales Engineering in 2018, and leads the team of Solution Architects, Sales Engineering, and Inside Engineers.

Financial Services - In 2019, in an effort to help its Technology Advisors accelerate their growth, Telarus launched the Telarus Capital Program, a financial services offering in which sales partners can borrow money or sell their recurring revenue to Telarus in exchange for a lump sum. The loan program is called "AnticiPAY" and the program in which agents sell a slice of their commissions to Telarus is called "FlexPAY".

Project Management - In 2020, to assist in the service delivery of complex and multi-vendor solutions, Telarus launched its Project Management-as-a-Service program. By assuming central control of complex service delivery, the Telarus team hopes to ensure timely and correct installation of technology infrastructure services purchased through its contracts.

Outside Investment
Columbia Capital - On December 1, 2020, Telarus announced that it had partnered with Columbia Capital, a private equity firm specializing in internet infrastructure, enterprise IT, and mobility solution investments. The deal gives Columbia Capital a minority stake in the company and represents the first time the three main owners (Edwards, Oborn, and Murray) have sold stock to an outside firm. The company plans to use their new access to capital to grow both organically and inorganically.

International expansion
Australia - In August 2018 Telarus launched its brand in Australia under the name "Tradewinds Technology Brokerage". In so doing it became the first American Technology Solutions Brokerage to launch the indirect sales model in Australia. Tradewinds is run by Sydney native, Tony Heywood.

Canada - In July 2019 Telarus announced it had expanded into Canada with Brian Ochab as its Regional Vice President. In January 2022, Telarus hired Matt Heron to take over the role of RVP of Canada, after working as a channel manager for six years at Calgary-based Shaw Communications.

Europe - In October 2019, Telarus expanded into the U.K. with the hire of Greg McVey as its Regional Vice President. The official launch of the U.K., and consequently Europe, took place on 18 April 2020. In March 2021, Telarus tapped London-native Paul Harris with the role of RVP of EMEA (Europe, Middle East, and Africa). Harris came to Telarus after 2 years at CDW UK, a provider of technology products and services for business, government and education entities in Europe.

Media and awards

Members of the Telecom Association voted Telarus the best master agent in 2017, 2015, 2012, 2011, 2010, 2009, and 2008.

References

Business software companies
Companies based in Salt Lake County, Utah
Companies established in 2002
Outsourcing companies
Sandy, Utah